The Northeast Organic Farming Association (NOFA) is a 501(c) non-profit organization in the United States that promotes healthy food, organic farming practices, and a clean environment. The purpose of the organization is to provide educational conferences, workshops, farm tours, and printed materials to educate farmers, gardeners, consumers, and land care professionals.

Membership

NOFA's membership is made up of about 5,000 farmers, gardeners, and consumers.  NOFA has chapters in the states of Connecticut, Massachusetts, New Hampshire, New Jersey, New York, Rhode Island, and Vermont. The NOFA Interstate Council coordinates all the chapters, conducts the annual NOFA Summer Conference, and acts as an umbrella organization for projects that concern all of the NOFA chapters, such as the Northeast Interstate Organic Certification Committee.

See also

 The Natural Farmer magazine

References 

Non-profit organizations based in Connecticut
Organic farming organizations
Organic farming in the United States
Agriculturalists
Agricultural organizations based in the United States
Northeastern United States